Gondi (go-n-dee), sometimes spelled as ghondi, or gundi, is a Persian Jewish dish of meatballs made from ground lamb, veal or chicken traditionally served on Shabbat. Lime is sometimes used as an ingredient. Gondi are served as part of chicken soup served on Shabbat and other Jewish holidays, similar to their Ashkenazi Jewish counterpart matzo balls. It is also served as iftar during Ramadan.

They are also sometimes served as a side dish, or as an appetizer. Accompaniments are Middle Eastern bread and raw greens such as mint, watercress, and basil.

Origins
The origin of Gondi is not known with certainty, as the Jewish community residing in various cities in Iran are said to have originated it, but it is commonly said to have first been made in the Jewish community of Tehran. Due to the expense of the meat, it was a specialty for Shabbat. It is one of the few dishes credited to Iranian Jews.

Jewish holidays

Larger than matza balls, gondi, named after a "bawdy euphemism for a certain part of the male anatomy", are served for the Purim meal of Persian Jews in Israel. It's also an alternative to matza balls for Passover.

Ingredients
Gondi recipes typically include some form of ground meat, chickpea flour (which may be prepared using toasted chickpeas), shredded onions, ground cardamom, and salt.

See also
Matzah ball- a similar Ashkenazi Jewish dish
List of Jewish cuisine dishes
 List of meatball dishes

References

Persian Jewish cuisine
Soups
Israeli cuisine
Mizrahi Jewish cuisine
Shabbat food
Meatballs
Passover foods
Iftar foods